Marin Čilić defend his 2009 title and he won in the final 6–4, 6–7(5–7), 6–3, against Michael Berrer.

Seeds

Draw

Finals

Top half

Bottom half

Qualifying

Seeds

Qualifiers

Qualifying draw

First qualifier

Second qualifier

Third qualifier

Fourth qualifier

External links
 Main Draw
 Qualifying Draw

Zagreb Indoors
PBZ Zagreb Indoors - Singles
2010 PBZ Zagreb Indoors